Isolated primary immunoglobulin M deficiency  is a poorly defined dysgammaglobulinemia characterized by decreased levels of IgM while levels of other immunoglobulins are normal. The immunodeficiency has been associated with some clinical disorders including recurrent infections, atopy, Bloom's syndrome, celiac disease, systemic lupus erythematosus and malignancy, but, surprisingly, SIgMD seems to also occur in asymptomatic individuals. High incidences of recurrent upper respiratory tract infections (77%), asthma (47%) and allergic rhinitis (36%) have also been reported. SIgMD seems to be a particularly rare antibody deficiency with a reported prevalence between 0.03% (general population) and 0.1% (hospitalized patients).

The cause of selective IgM deficiency remains unclear, although various mechanisms have been proposed, such as an increase in regulatory T cell functions, defective T helper cell functions and impaired terminal differentiation of B lymphocytes into IgM-secreting cells among others. In addition it was recently described that hypomorphic mutations in the B-cell receptor (BLNK & BTK) lead to selective IgM deficiency. 

It is however puzzling that class switching seems to happen normally (serum levels of other antibodies are normal), while dysfunctioning of IgM synthesis is expected to occur together with abnormalities in other immunoglobulins. Notwithstanding a clear pathogenesis and commonly accepted definition, a cutoff for SIgMD could be the lower limit of the serum IgM reference range, such as 43 mg/dL in adults or even 20 mg/dL.

See also 
 Immunodeficiency with hyper-immunoglobulin M
 Immunoglobulin M
 List of cutaneous conditions

References

External links 

Predominantly antibody deficiencies
Noninfectious immunodeficiency-related cutaneous conditions